Blast from the Past may refer to:
 Blast from the Past (film), a 1999 romantic comedy film
 Blast from the Past (novel), a 1998 suspense novel by Ben Elton
 "Blast from the Past", a 1997 James Bond short story by Raymond Benson
 "Blast from the Past", a 2001 song by Quiet Riot from Guilty Pleasures
 Blast from the Past (album), a 2000 album by Gamma Ray
 "Blast from the Past!", an episode of The Raccoons
 "Blast from the Past" (Teenage Mutant Ninja Turtles episode), 1989
 "Blast from the Past" (Veronica Mars), 2005
 "A Blast From the Past" (Diagnosis: Murder), 1995
 "Blast from the Past", a segment in the Hamish & Andy Show
 "Blast From the Past", an episode of Dallas
 "Blast From the Past", an episode of NCIS